Clinton Hall may refer to:
 The third, fourth, or fifth home of the New York Mercantile Library, United States. (The fourth home was the former Astor Opera House from 1853 to 1890.)
 Clinton Hall (Ithaca, New York), a historic commercial building in Ithaca, New York, United States.
 Clinton J. Hall (1926-1984), American lawyer and politician

Architectural disambiguation pages